Princes Park is a Liverpool City Council Ward in the Liverpool Riverside Parliamentary constituency. The population of the ward taken at the 2011 census was 17,104. The ward is ethnically diverse, with a 53% white, 16% black, 9% asian and 10% mixed ethnicity population.

The ward was formed for the 2004 Municipal elections taking the whole of the former Granby ward with part of the former Abercromby ward. It contains the Canning area and parts of Dingle and Toxteth areas as well as Princes Park itself.  The Liverpool Women's Hospital is also within its bounds.

Councillors

The ward returned eight Councillors. 

Following the resignation of Tim Moore a by-election was held on 17 October 2019; the winner Joanne Anderson was elected as the Mayor of Liverpool in May 2021. 

Former Lord Mayor of Liverpool Anna Rothery was shortlisted and subsequently removed from contention to be the Labour Party candidate for City Mayor and later resigned from the Labour Party to sit as an independent councillor on 23 November 2021.

 indicates seat up for re-election after boundary changes.

 indicates seat up for re-election.

 indicates change in affiliation.

 indicates seat up for re-election after casual vacancy.

Election results

Elections of the 2020s

Elections of the 2010s

Elections of the 2000s 

After the boundary change of 2004 the whole of Liverpool City Council faced election. Three Councillors were returned.

• italics denotes the sitting Councillor
• bold denotes the winning candidate

See also
 Liverpool City Council
 Liverpool City Council elections 1880–present
 Liverpool Town Council elections 1835 - 1879

External links
 Liverpool City Council: Ward profile

References

Wards of Liverpool
Toxteth